CJAG-FM is a Canadian radio station that broadcasts an active rock format at 92.3 FM in Jasper, Alberta. The station is branded as "The Lone Wolf" and airs a rock format largely simulcast from CFBR-FM in Edmonton. It is owned by and located in the Athabasca Hotel.

On September 17, 2001, citing a lack of local radio service or ability to disseminate emergency messages, the CRTC authorized Athabasca to build on the 92.3 MHz frequency in Jasper, initially as a partial rebroadcaster of CIRK. It is authorized to rebroadcast an Edmonton station for up to 50 minutes each hour, with the remaining 10 minutes to be filled by locally generated information.

References

External links
CJAG Jasper
 

Radio stations in Alberta
Active rock radio stations in Canada
Radio stations established in 2002
2002 establishments in Alberta